KVUT (99.7 FM) is a terrestrial American radio station, broadcasting programming from National Public Radio (NPR) along with local news, weather, and community information.  During evenings and overnight, KVUT airs jazz music via PubJazz.  Licensed to Cuney, Texas, United States, the station is owned by The University of Texas at Tyler.

The station began broadcasting in "soft launch" mode - testing programming - on May 13, 2021, with a public event to celebrate the station pending in the Fall of 2021. 
During this "soft launch", the station carried news programs from NPR and APM such as Morning Edition, All Things Considered, Here and Now, and Marketplace in the day and jazz music from the UT Tyler Jazz Ensemble at night.
KVUT officially launched September 14, 2021.  Local programming consists of news and public affairs, with more local content to be added over time.

History
KVUT was initially proposed by New Wavo Communications Group, owners of co-channel KVST in Huntsville, Texas, through a short form application filed with the Federal Communications Commission and granted on November 6, 2015. The facility's transmission site was proposed to be constructed near the small town of Cuney, giving the community its first licensed aural service.

The construction permit was granted the call sign KSOC on October 18, 2017. The proposed facility was permitted to operate, once licensed, at an ERP of 100 watts, from an elevation of -9.8 meters height above average terrain. New Wavo Communications Group sold the construction permit for the facility to North Texas Radio Group, L.P. on August 14, 2017. The facility callsign was changed to KOEE on September 18, 2018, inheriting the set from its sister station in Tipton, Oklahoma, which in turn, became KSOC. The KSOC callsign was long utilized by Urban One Adult Contemporary station KZMJ in the Metroplex, as "K-Soul 94.5". The callsign historically stands for Soul Of the City.

KOEE signed on the air on October 10, 2018, and received an initial License to Cover from the Federal Communications Commission on October 22, 2018.

The station changed its call sign to KVUT on December 19, 2019.

On June 16, 2020, North Texas Radio Group, LP filed to transfer the license of KVUT to The University of Texas at Tyler, after a deal was reached to sell the station to the University for $120,000. UT Tyler has relaunched KVUT as an NPR and APM affiliated station, featuring news and talk programming, as well as jazz music in evenings and overnight.

The facility itself has been relocated to a University-owned site in Bullard, where it operates with 1,600 watts @ 154 meters, adding Tyler and Jacksonville to its expanded coverage area. Studios for the station are located on the main campus of The University of Texas at Tyler, 3900 University Blvd. in Tyler; KVUT broadcasts from within the R. Don Cowan Fine and Performing Arts Center (otherwise known as the Cowan Center).

KVUT is the first local public media outlet in East Texas as public television via PBS is still provided only on cable via KERA-TV out of Dallas or KLTS-TV out of Shreveport.

In early April 2022, KVUT changed its website domain name to kvut.org; it was originally uttr.org (short for "UT-Tyler Radio").

References

External links
 Official station website

VUT